Triángulo de Amor Bizarro is a Galician post-punk/indie rock band formed in 2004.

History
The group was formed in A Coruña although the members are from different parts of Barbanza, and A Coruña. They take their name from the song "Bizarre Love Triangle" by the British band New Order. Before recording their first album, Triángulo de Amor Bizarro recorded two self-produced demos that reached the semifinals of the demo competition DEMO Project of the Festival Internacional de Benicàssim two consecutive years in 2004 and 2005. In their beginnings the band was a quartet, deriving over time into a quintet before the recording of their first album, in which they form as a trio, until the entrance of Oscar Vilariño and Rafael Mallo, and with the departure of Julián Ulpiano (drums) in 2009.

Once signed for the label Mushroom Pillow, they recorded their debut self-titled album, Triángulo de Amor Bizarro in 2007, with technical Carlos Hernandez, known for the producing independent music albums independent of well-known bands like Los Planetas Sr. Chinarro and Mercromina . The album received very good reviews from the press, appearing at the top among Spanish albums 2007 (ranked 2nd in the journal Mondosonoro and 9th in Rockdelux). In addition it was also picked among the best of the decade's most influential music media, as Rockdelux, Mondosonoro, Jenesaispop and others.

That same year they also release El Hombre del Siglo V, a compilation album of their two early demos which also includes three new songs.

At the end of 2009 they begin to record their second album entitled Año Santo produced by Paco Loco and is released in May 2010. De la Monarquía a la Criptocracia is released as a single accompanied by a video directed by Luis Cervero. Año Santo receives positive critical acclaim from both the press and public, and is celebrated as one of the best so far the year. They tour the album in Mexico and play the festivals of the peninsula, like el FIB, Paredes de Coura, and de México, where they participate in Corona Capital. The promotional tour is extended to 2011.

In 2011 Rubén Muñoz, also known as Zippo, enters the band and Oscar Vilariño leaves. They win the IMAS prize in Mexico for best Spanish band. Año Santo is nominated to 9 categories in independent music awards (UFI) and are awarded with four of them, including Album of the Year.

In 2012 they recorded the digital single Ellas Se Burlaron de Mi Magia at the Red Bull Studios in Madrid, produced by Peter Kember (Sonic Boom) and mixed by Roberto Mallo. Later that year they began recording their third studio album, Victoria Mística. The album is released in July 2013, produced by the band itself, recorded in their own studio by Roberto Mallo, mixing by Manny Nieto (Breeders, Health, The Wolves) and mastering by Shane Smith.

In 2016 they released Salve Discordia recorded by Carlos Hernández Nombela. The band embarked on a tour of a large number of halls and festivals in Spain, such as Bilbao BBK Live, Noroeste Pop Rock in A Coruña and Primavera Sound. They then toured across the United States and Mexico.

At the beginning of 2017 they received the Premio Ruido, awarded by the Association of Music Journalists of Spain for the best album of the year. They won the four major awards at the Independent Music Awards, receiving Best Artist, Album of the Year, Rock Album and Music Production.

In 2018 they released their latest work, an EP entitled El Gatopardo

Discography
Triángulo de Amor Bizarro (2007)
El Hombre del Siglo V (2007)
Año Santo (2010)
Victoria Mística (2013)
Salve Discordia (2016)
El Gatopardo (EP, 2018)
Triángulo de Amor Bizarro (2020) No. 5 Spain

References

External links

Spanish musical groups